In mathematics — specifically, in the fields of probability theory and inverse problems — Besov measures and associated Besov-distributed random variables are generalisations of the notions of Gaussian measures and random variables, Laplace distributions, and other classical distributions.  They are particularly useful in the study of inverse problems on function spaces for which a Gaussian Bayesian prior is an inappropriate model.  The construction of a Besov measure is similar to the construction of a Besov space, hence the nomenclature.

Definitions 

For , define

Let  be a scale parameter, similar to the precision (the reciprocal of the variance) of a Gaussian measure.  We now define a -valued random variable  by

Properties

It is easy to show that, when t ≤ s, the Xt,p norm is finite whenever the Xs,p norm is.  Therefore, the spaces Xs,p and Xt,p are nested:

This is consistent with the usual nesting of smoothness classes of functions f: D → R:
for example, the Sobolev space H2(D) is a subspace of H1(D) and in turn of the Lebesgue space L2(D) = H0(D); the Hölder space C1(D) of continuously differentiable functions is a subspace of the space C0(D) of continuous functions.

It can be shown that the series defining u converges in Xt,p almost surely for any t < s − d / p, and therefore gives a well-defined Xt,p-valued random variable. Note that Xt,p is a larger space than Xs,p, and in fact thee random variable u is almost surely not in the smaller space Xs,p. The space Xs,p is rather the Cameron-Martin space of this probability measure in the Gaussian case p = 2. The random variable u is said to be Besov distributed with parameters (κ, s, p), and the induced probability measure is called a Besov measure.

See also

References

 
 

Inverse problems
Measures (measure theory)
Theory of probability distributions